Thibaut Vion (born 11 December 1993) is a French professional footballer who plays as a defensive midfielder for Bulgarian First League club CSKA Sofia. He has been capped at international level playing in the U19 and U20 squads.

Club career
As 17 years old, Vion joined Portuguese club F.C. Porto from the youth academy of Metz. He expressed that he did not know Portuguese so had to learn it and on top of that he did not speak English well.  He made his debut for Porto B against Tondela in a 2–2 draw.

On 30 August 2017, he joined French Ligue 2 club Chamois Niortais on a three-year contract.

International career
Vion played at the 2012 UEFA U19 Championship. He was selected for France U20 in the 2013 FIFA U-20 World Cup. In the group stage 2–1 defeat against Spain U20 he came on as a 78th-minute substitute for Florian Thauvin and scored his debut goal in the 90+1 minute.

Career statistics

Club

Honours
CSKA Sofia
 Bulgarian Cup: 2020–21

References

External links
 
 
 

Living people
1993 births
Sportspeople from Meurthe-et-Moselle
Association football forwards
French footballers
France youth international footballers
French expatriate footballers
FC Porto B players
FC Metz players
R.F.C. Seraing (1922) players
Chamois Niortais F.C. players
PFC CSKA Sofia players
Liga Portugal 2 players
Ligue 1 players
Ligue 2 players
First Professional Football League (Bulgaria) players
Expatriate footballers in Portugal
French expatriate sportspeople in Portugal
Expatriate footballers in Bulgaria
French expatriate sportspeople in Bulgaria
Footballers from Grand Est
French expatriate sportspeople in Belgium
Expatriate footballers in Belgium